The Arco Naturale is a natural arch on the east coast of the island of Capri. Dating from the Paleolithic age, it is the remains of a collapsed grotto. The arch spans 12 m at a height of 18 m above ground and consists of limestone.

Gallery

References

External links

Capri, Campania
Natural arches
Landforms of Campania
Rock formations of Italy